Edward Michael 'Paddy' Burke (19 August 1898 – 20 June 1953) was an Australian rules footballer who played with Hawthorn in the Victorian Football League (VFL).

Family and early life
The seventh of ten children born to Michael Joseph Burke (1861–1931) and Jane Burke, nee Robinson (1860–1923), Edward Michael Burke was born at Fitzroy on 19 August 1898.

Prior to his senior football career Burke served in World War I, being injured several in times in fighting in France.

In 1922, he married Doris Irene Hepburn (1902–1950).

Football
Burke, who had been recruited from Croydon in 1921, first played for Hawthorn when they were in the Victorian Football Association. He made 15 appearances for Hawthorn in the 1925 VFL season, their first in the Victorian Football League and was club captain for part of 1926.

Later life
Burke died at Hawthorn in June 1953 and is buried at Box Hill Cemetery.

References

External links

1898 births
Australian military personnel of World War I
Australian rules footballers from Melbourne
Hawthorn Football Club players
Hawthorn Football Club (VFA) players
1953 deaths
People from Fitzroy, Victoria
Military personnel from Melbourne
Burials at Box Hill Cemetery